Kimberton Village Historic District is a national historic district located in East Pikeland Township, Chester County, Pennsylvania. The district includes 49 contributing buildings and 3 contributing structures in the village of Kimberton Village. The three original buildings listed in 1976, were the "Sign of the Bear" tavern (1768), Chrisman grist mill (1796, now post office), and French Creek Boarding School (1787, 1813).  The 1987 boundary increase expanded the district to include a variety of vernacular farmhouses, barns and other outbuildings, a grange hall, a former Quaker meetinghouse, a frame milk receiving station, and railroad station.  The contributing structures are a dam and stone arch bridge.

It was added to the National Register of Historic Places in 1976, with a boundary increase in 1987.

References

Historic districts on the National Register of Historic Places in Pennsylvania
Historic districts in Chester County, Pennsylvania
National Register of Historic Places in Chester County, Pennsylvania